The lists are divided by Canadian language:

List of English-language Canadian television series
List of French-language Canadian television series

See also
List of Canadian animated television series

Lists of television series by country of production